Red Earth Cree Nation ( kâ-mihkwaskîwakâhk) is a Cree community in Saskatchewan, Canada. The main settlement of Red Earth is located on the Carrot River and accessed by  Highway 55. Nearby to the east is the Shoal Lake First Nation.

Demographics
The total registered population was 1,869 as of October, 2018 with 1,602 members living on reserve.

Government
Through a Custom Electoral System the members elect a Chief and 4 councillors. The band office is located in the settlement of Red Earth.

Education
Kiwaytinok Elementary School and John William Head Memorial Education Centre offer Kindergarten to Grade 12.

References 

First Nations governments in Saskatchewan
Cree governments